The Jyoti Central High School was founded in 2007 in Ekma, Chhapra, Bihar, India by Dr. Shiv Kumar.

External links
ICBSE.com: Jyoti Central High School, Ekma
Jyoti Central High School website

Saran district
High schools and secondary schools in Bihar
Educational institutions established in 2008
2008 establishments in Bihar